Tim Alexander (born 1965) is an American musician.

Tim Alexander may also refer to:

Tim Alexander (footballer) (born 1973), English footballer
Tim Alexander (visual effects), Academy Award nominated visual effects supervisor
Tim Alexander (cricketer), English cricketer
Timothy Alexander (born 1949), Australian sailor